Clearlake were an indie rock band, based in Brighton, England. They released three albums between 2001 and 2006. The band has been inactive since 2009.

History
The band formed in 1999, and released their debut single, "Winterlight", in January 2000. The limited edition release was awarded Single of the Week in a number of music publications, gained airplay on Radio 1 as Mark and Lard's record of the week and sold out within a fortnight, making the UK Top 100. A number of other singles followed, and the band went on to support Pulp and The Delgados and played at Scott Walker's Meltdown with Elliott Smith.

By April 2001, they had recorded and released their debut album, Lido. After a slot on Later... with Jools Holland, their television debut, and the release of a fourth single, "Let Go", the band started work on their second album. Cedars was released in February 2003. The third, Amber, was released in January 2006.

Clearlake have written their fourth album and played their only show of 2007 at The Brunswick, Hove, on 1 September 2007. Seven new songs were debuted at the show. 2008 was a far more active year for Clearlake. On 6 May 2008 the band supported Death Cab for Cutie (their first show of that year) before recording new track "One of a Kind", which was released as a web-only single on 9 May via their website. A further single, "Dark Blue", was recorded in the same way in August 2008 and released on 1 September 2008. The band started 2009 by releasing one final single from the new album, "The Credit or The Blame". The album from which those singles were supposed to be taken has never been released.

In December 2010, a Jason Pegg cover version of the Sea Nymphs song "Tree Tops High" appeared on Leader of the Starry Skies - A Loyal Companion, a fundraising compilation album to benefit the hospitalised Cardiacs/Sea Nymphs leader Tim Smith.

Solo activity
Since Clearlake's last activity, Jason Pegg has been playing solo and with Billy Bragg. Pegg's self-titled debut album came out in 2009, and Silver Noise was released as a download-only album in 2014. Jim Briffett had performed with The Miserable Rich and his solo album Mountains 'n' Lightning was released in 2011.

Lineup

Last
Jason Pegg (vocals, guitar, keyboards)
David 'Woody' Woodward (bass, guitar, vocals)
Toby May (drums)
Jim Briffett (guitar, vocals) - since 2007

Former
James Butcher (drums)
Sam Hewitt (keyboards, guitar, vocals)

Discography

Albums
Lido (2001)
Cedars (2003)
Amber (2006)

Singles and EPs
"Winterlight" (2000)
"Don't Let the Cold In" (2000)
"Something to Look Forward To" (2000)
"Let Go" (2001)
"Almost the Same" (2003)
"The Mind Is Evil" (2003)
"Can't Feel a Thing" (2003)
Wonder if the Snow Will Settle (2005)
"Good Clean Fun" (2005)
"Neon" (2006)
"It's Getting Light Outside" (2006)
"One of a Kind" (2008)
"Dark Blue" (2008)
"The Credit or The Blame" (2009)

References

External links

Domino Recording Company artists
English indie rock groups
Musical groups from Brighton and Hove